Natalia Bratiuk (born 15 July 1986) is a Russian Paralympic cross country skier and biathlete who won bronze medal at the 2014 Winter Paralympics in Sochi, Russia. In 2013, she was silver medalist at IPC Biathlon and Cross-Country Skiing World Championships.
She participated in the 2018 Winter Paralympics, finishing sixth.

References

1986 births
Living people
Russian female biathletes
Paralympic bronze medalists for Russia
Paralympic silver medalists for Russia
Cross-country skiers at the 2014 Winter Paralympics
Biathletes at the 2014 Winter Paralympics
Biathletes at the 2018 Winter Paralympics
Paralympic medalists in biathlon
Medalists at the 2014 Winter Paralympics
Paralympic biathletes of Russia
21st-century Russian women